2018 Swedish elections may refer to the following elections that occurred in 2018:
 2018 Swedish general election, to elect the 349 members of the Riksdag
 2018 Swedish county council elections, to elect the 21 county councils
 2018 Swedish municipal elections, to elect the 290 municipal councils